The Sacred Talisman is the third album by Swedish power metal band Nocturnal Rites, their second on Century Media.

Track listing
"Destiny Calls" - 3:58
"The Iron Force" - 4:20
"Ride On" - 3:16
"Free at Last" - 3:49
"Hold On to the Flame" - 4:08
"Eternity Holds" - 4:00
"When Fire Comes to Ice" - 3:48
"The Legend Lives On" - 5:57
"The King's Command" - 3:24
"Unholy Powers" - 3:12
"Glorious" - 3:23
"Journey through Time"  (bonus track on the Japanese version)

Personnel
Anders Zackrisson - lead and backing vocals
Fredrik Mannberg - guitar
Nils Norberg - lead and rhythm guitar, synth guitar, spacelizer
Nils Eriksson - bass
Owe Lingvall - drums
Mattias Bernhardsson - keyboards

References

1999 albums
Nocturnal Rites albums
Century Media Records albums